Ivana Jorović was the defending champion and successfully defended her title, defeating Vitalia Diatchenko in the final, 6–4, 7–5.

Seeds

Main draw

Finals

Top half

Bottom half

References 
 Main draw

Ankara Cup - Singles
Ankara Cup